Maparaju (possibly from Quechua map'a dirty, stained, rahu mountain with snow, "dirty (or stained) snow mountain") is a  mountain in the Cordillera Blanca in the Andes of Peru. It is located between Huaraz and Huari provinces, in the region of Ancash. Maparaju lies at the head of the Cayesh valley, southwest of Cayesh and Artisa and northeast of Qarwakancha.

References

Mountains of Peru
Mountains of Ancash Region
Lakes of Peru
Lakes of Ancash Region